Charles Robert Winston (1915–2003) was an American jeweler, sculptor, and educator. He was known for his organic forms and sculptural jewelry in 1950s and 1960s. Winston was a co-founder of the Metal Arts Guild of San Francisco, a non-profit, arts educational organization. In 1997, he was honored as a Fellow of the American Craft Council.

Biography 
Winston taught at the California College of Arts and Crafts (now California College of the Arts) from c. 1942 to 1956. His students included Florence Resnikoff, Irena Brynner, and Robert Dhaemers. He has been credited with reviving (within the period of 1950s Modernism) the metalsmith processes of lost-wax casting, and centrifugal casting.

In 1951, he was featured on the television program "Art in Your Life" by the San Francisco Art Museum (now San Francisco Museum of Modern Art), where he described his mobile sculpture making process. Winston created public play sculpture named, "Oakland Monster" or "Mid Century Monster" (1952) at Lake Merritt near Bellevue Avenue in Oakland.

Exhibitions 
In 1954, Winston was part of a group exhibition of jewelry at Gallery of America House by the American Craftsmen's Educational Council in New York City; other participants included Margaret De Patta, Mary Schimpff, Robert von Neumann, and John Paul Miller. In 1985, he was part of the group exhibition, Structure and Ornament: American Modernist Jewelry 1940–1960 shown at Fifty-50 Gallery, New York City.

References

External links 
 Oral history interview with Bob Winston, 2002 July 31-October 10, from Archives of American Art, Smithsonian Institution

1915 births
2003 deaths
American jewelry designers
American jewellers
Modernist designers
California College of the Arts faculty
Sculptors from California
People from Long Beach, California
Artists from San Francisco